Robin Model Sen. Sec. School is situated in city Dhuri District Sangrur in state Punjab of India. School was established in the year 1980.

Affiliated to the Punjab School Education Board, the School imparts education from Nursery to XII standard.

Houses 
The students from class V to XII are divided into four houses:
 Shaheed Bhagat Singh House
 Shaheed Udham Singh House
 Rani Jhansi House
 Mother Teressa House

External links
 http://www.robinmodelschool.com

High schools and secondary schools in Punjab, India
Education in Sangrur
1980 establishments in Punjab, India